The Murder Game may refer to:

Film and TV
The Murder Game (TV series), a 2003 BBC television series
The Murder Game (2006 film), a 2006 film
The Murder Game (1965 film), a 1965 film
Novels
The Murder Game (Doctor Who), a 1997 Doctor Who novel
The Murder Game, a novel by Beverly Barton
Murder Game, a 1991 novel by Bill Adler and Bruce Cassiday with  a $10,000 reward for solving the crime